The 2013 Grand Prix SAR La Princesse Lalla Meryem was a professional women's tennis tournament played on outdoor clay courts. It was the 13th edition of the tournament which was part of the WTA International tournaments of the 2013 WTA Tour. It took place at the Royal Tennis Club de Marrakech in Marrakesh, Morocco between 22 and 28 April 2013.

Singles main draw entrants

Seeds

 1 Rankings are as of April 15, 2013.

Other entrants
The following players received wildcards into the singles main draw:
  Fatima Zahrae El Allami
  Lina Qostal

The following players received entry as qualifiers:
  Tímea Babos
  Estrella Cabeza Candela
  Michaela Hončová
  Karin Knapp

The following players received entry as lucky losers:
  Nina Bratchikova
  Alexandra Cadanțu

Withdrawals
Before the tournament
  Irina-Camelia Begu (right shoulder injury)
  Dominika Cibulková
  Polona Hercog
  Romina Oprandi
  Aleksandra Wozniak

Doubles main draw entrants

Seeds

1 Rankings are as of April 15, 2013.

Other entrants
The following pairs received wildcards into the doubles main draw:
  Fatima Zahrae El Allami /  Nadia Lalami
  Alizé Lim /  Lina Qostal

Champions

Singles

 Francesca Schiavone def.  Lourdes Domínguez Lino, 6–1, 6–3

Doubles

  Tímea Babos /  Mandy Minella def.  Petra Martić /  Kristina Mladenovic, 6–3, 6–1

References

External links
Official Website

Grand Prix SAR La Princesse Lalla Meryem
Morocco Open
2013 in Moroccan tennis